The decolonisation of Asia was the gradual growth of independence movements in Asia, leading ultimately to the retreat of foreign powers and the creation of several nation-states in the region.

Background 

The decline of Spain and Portugal in the 17th century paved the way for other European powers, namely the Netherlands, France and England. Portugal would lose influence in all but three of its colonies, Portuguese India, Macau and Timor.

By the end of the 17th century, the Dutch had taken over much of the old Portuguese colonies, and had established a strong presence in present-day Indonesia, with colonies in Aceh, Bantam, Makassar and Jakarta. The Dutch also had trade links with Siam, Japan, China and Bengal.

The British had competed with Portuguese, Spanish and Dutch for their interests in Asia since the early 17th century and by the mid-19th century held much of India (via the British East India Company), as well as Burma, Ceylon, Malaya and Singapore. After The Indian Rebellion of 1857, Queen Victoria was declared Empress of India, thus solidifying the British rule on the subcontinent. The last British acquisition in Asia was the New Territories of Hong Kong, which was leased from the Qing emperor in 1897, expanding the British colony originally ceded in the Treaty of Nanking in 1842.

The French had little success in India following defeats against the British in the 17th century, though they held onto possessions on the east coast of India (such as Pondicherry and Mahar) until decolonisation. The French established their most lucrative and substantial colony in Indochina in 1862, eventually occupying the present-day areas of Vietnam, Laos and Cambodia by 1887.

Japan's first colony was the island of Taiwan, occupied in 1874 and officially ceded by the Qing emperor in 1894. Japan continued its early imperialism with the annexation of Korea in 1910.

The United States entered the region in 1898 during the Spanish–American War, taking the Philippines as its sole colony through a mock battle in the capital and the purchase of the Philippines from Spain after the declaration of independence and the First Philippine Republic.

Asian colonies from the 17th century to the end of the Second World War 
The following list shows the colonial powers following the end of World War II in 1945, their colonial or administrative possessions and the date of decolonisation.

///:
 (1912)
 Jiangxi Soviet (1931)
 Fujian (1933)
 (1924/1946)
 (1949)

:
 (1945)
 (1946)
 (1946)
 Cambodia (1953)
 (1953)
 French India (1954)
 (1948)

 (1999/2002)
:
 Manchuria (Manchukuo), Northern China (1945/1946)
 (1945/1946)
 (1945/1948)
 (1945/1948)
 (1945/1948)
 Taiwan and Penghu (1945/1952)

 (1965)
:
 (1642)
 (1945/1949)
 Dutch New Guinea (1962)
:
 Portuguese India (1961)
 (1975/2002)
 (1999)
 ( prior to 1917/1922)
 (1924)
 Manchuria (Manchukuo), Northern China (1946)
 (1948)
 (1991)
 (1991)
 (1991)
 (1991)
 (1991)
:
 (1662)
 (1898)

:
 (1919)
 (1947) (1971)
 (1922)
 (1932)
 (1946)
 (1947)
 (1947)
 (1948)
 (1948)
 (1948)
 (1957)
 (1960)
 (1961)
 Sabah (North Borneo) (1963)
 Sarawak (1963)
 (1965)
 (1965)
 (1967)
 (1970)
 (1971)
 (1971)
 (1971)
 (1984)
 (1997)
:
 (1946)
 (1948)
 (1986)
 (1994)

Asia 

 Table notes

Individual countries

Burma 
See Burma's colonial era.

Burma was almost completely occupied by the Imperial Japanese Army during the Second World War. Many Burmese fought alongside Japan in the initial stages of the war, though the Burmese Army and most Burmese switched sides in 1945.

A transitional government sponsored by the British government was formed in the years following the Second World War, ultimately leading to Burma's independence in January 1948.

Cambodia 
See Cambodia's path to independence.

Following the capitulation of France and the formation of the Vichy regime, France's Indochinese possessions were given to Japan. While there was some argument that Indochina should not be returned to France, particularly from the United States, Cambodia nevertheless remained under French rule after the end of hostilities.

France had placed Norodom Sihanouk on the throne in 1941 and was hoping for a puppet monarch. They were mistaken. However, the King led the way to Cambodian independence in 1953, taking advantage of the background of the First Indochina War being fought in Vietnam.

Ceylon 
See Ceylon independence.

Ceylon was an important base of operations for the Western Allies during the Second World War. The British gave in to popular pressure for independence and in February 1948, the country won its independence as the Dominion of Ceylon.

Hong Kong 
Hong Kong was returned to the United Kingdom following its occupation by the Japanese during the Second World War. It was controlled directly by a British governor until the expiry of the ninety-nine-year lease of the New Territories, which occurred in 1997. From that date, the territory was returned to People's Republic of China and controlled as a Special Administrative Region of the People's Republic of China.

Philippines 

The Philippines unilaterally declared independence from Spain on 12 June 1898 under the leadership of President Emilio Aguinaldo, culminating the 1896 Revolution. Unbeknownst to the newly established government and the Filipino people in general, the United States of America had secretly arranged to purchase the colony along with several other possessions from Spain through the Treaty of Paris that concluded the Spanish–American War. After staging a mock battle in Manila, the Philippine–American War ensued until the Philippine government capitulated in 1901.

The Philippines subsequently underwent certain influences under the hegemony of the United States, first as an Protectorate, then as a Commonwealth. It was then occupied by the Japanese during the Second World War. In 1943, Japan granted its short-lived independence to the Philippines and in 1944, the Allied invasion of the Philippines by combined U.S. and Filipino troops began, which resulted in Americans and Filipinos regaining full control of the nation. In 1946, the United States recognised Philippine independence.

Timeline 
The "colonial power" and "colonial name" columns are merged when required to denote territories, where current countries are established, that have not been decolonised but achieved independence in different ways.

Soviet Union 
The 9 states may be divided into the following five regional categories. The distinguishing traits of each region result from geographic and cultural factors as well as their respective historical relations with Russia. Not included in these categories are the several de facto independent states presently lacking international recognition (read below: Separatist conflicts).

British Colonies, Protectorates and Mandates

List of European colonies in Asia
British colonies in South Asia, East Asia, And Southeast Asia:

 British Burma (1824–1948, merged with India by the British from 1886 to 1937)
 British Ceylon (1815–1948, now Sri Lanka)
  British Hong Kong (1842–1997)
  Colonial India (includes the territory of present-day India, Pakistan and Bangladesh)
 Danish India (1696–1869)
 Swedish Parangipettai (1733)
 British India (1613–1947)
 British East India Company (1757–1858)
 British Raj (1858–1947)

French colonies in South and Southeast Asia:

  French India (1769–1954)
  French Indochina (1887–1953), including:
 French Cambodia (1863–1953)
 French Laos (1893–1953)
 French Cochinchine, Annam and Tonkin (1862–1949, now Vietnam)
 Guangzhouwan (1898–1945)

Dutch, British, Portuguese colonies and Russian territories in Asia:

  Dutch India (1605–1825)
  Dutch Bengal
  Dutch Ceylon (1656–1796)
  Portuguese Ceylon (1505–1658)
  Dutch East Indies (now Indonesia) – Dutch colony from 1800 to 1949 (included Netherlands New Guinea until 1962)
  Portuguese India (1510–1961)
  Portuguese Macau – Portuguese colony, the first European colony in China (1557–1999)
  Portuguese Timor (1702–1975, now East Timor)
  Malaya (now part of Malaysia):
 Portuguese Malacca (1511–1641)
 Dutch Malacca (1641–1824)
 British Malaya, included:
Straits Settlements (1826–1946)
 Federated Malay States (1895–1946)
 Unfederated Malay States (1885–1946)
 Federation of Malaya (under British rule, 1948–1963)
  British Borneo (now part of Malaysia), including:
  Labuan (1848–1946)h
  North Borneo (1882–1941)
  Crown Colony of North Borneo (1946–1963)
  Crown Colony of Sarawak (1946–1963)
 Brunei
  British Brunei (1888–1984) (British protectorate)
  Outer Manchuria – ceded to Russian Empire through Treaty of Aigun (1858) and Treaty of Peking (1860)
 Philippines:
 Spanish Philippines (1565–1898, 3rd longest European colony in Asia, 333 years),
  Singapore – British colony (1819–1959)
 Taiwan:
 Spanish Formosa (1626–1642)
 Dutch Formosa (1624–1662)

Bahrain

 Portuguese Bahrain (1521–1602)
   British Protectorate (1861–1971)

Iraq

 Mandatory Iraq (1920–1932) (British protectorate)
 Kingdom of Iraq (1932–1958)
Israel and Palestine

 Mandatory Palestine (1920–1948) (British Mandate)
Jordan

 Emirate of Transjordan (1921–1946) (British protectorate)
Kuwait

 Sheikhdom of Kuwait (1899–1961) (British protectorate)
Lebanon and Syria

 French Mandate for Syria and the Lebanon (1923–1946)
Oman

 Portuguese Oman (1507–1650)
 Muscat and Oman (1892–1971) (British protectorate)
Qatar

 British protectorate of Qatar (1916–1971)
United Arab Emirates

 Trucial States (1820–1971) (British protectorate)
Yemen

 Aden Protectorate (1869–1963)
 Colony of Aden (1937–1963)
 Federation of South Arabia (1962–1967)
 Protectorate of South Arabia (1963–1967)

Independent states
 Afghanistan – founded by the Anglo-Afghan Treaty of 1919 of the United Kingdom and declared independence in 1919
  Emirate of Afghanistan (1879–1919) (British protectorate)
   China – independent, but within European cultures of influence which were largely limited to the colonised ports except for Manchuria. 
 Concessions in China
 Shanghai International Settlement (1863–1941)
 Shanghai French Concession (1849–1943)
 Concessions in Tianjin (1860–1947)
  Bhutan – in British sphere of influence
  Iran – in the Russian sphere of influence in the north and British in the south
  Japan – a Great power that had its own colonial empire (including Korea and Taiwan)
    Mongolia – in the Russian sphere of influence and later Soviet controlled
  Nepal – in British sphere of influence
  Thailand – the only independent state in Southeast Asia, but bordered by a British sphere of influence in the north and south and French influence in the northeast and east
  Turkey – successor to the Ottoman Empire in 1923; the Ottoman Empire itself could be considered a colonial empire

Asian colonies from the 17th century to the end of the Second World War (Japanese) 
The following list shows the colonial powers following the end of World War II in 1945, their colonial or administrative possessions and the date of decolonisation.

 :
  Manchuria (Manchukuo), Northern China (1945/1946)
  (1945/1946)
  (1945/1948)
  (1945/1948)
  (1945/1948)
  (1945/1949)
 
  (1965)
  (1642)
  (1945/1949)
  Netherlands New Guinea (1962)

Disclaimer: Not all areas were considered part of Imperial Japan but rather part of puppet states & sphere of influence, allies, included separately for demographic purposes. Sources: POPULSTAT Asia Oceania

Other occupied World War 2 islands:

 Andaman Islands (India) – 29 March 1942 – 9 September 1945
 Christmas Island (Australia) – March 1942 – October 1945

Areas attacked but not conquered 

 Kohima and Manipur (India)
 Dornod (Khalkhin Gol, Mongolia)
 Midway Atoll (United States)

Raided without immediate intent of occupation 

 Air raids
 Pearl Harbor (Hawaii, United States)
 Colombo and Trincomalee (Sri Lanka)
 Air raids on Australia, including:
 Broome (Western Australia, Australia)
 Darwin (Northern Territory, Australia)
 Townsville (Queensland, Australia)
 Dutch Harbor (Alaska, United States)
 Lookout Air Raids (Oregon, United States)
 Naval bombardment by submarine
 British Columbia (Canada)
 Santa Barbara (California, United States)
 Fort Stevens (Oregon, United States)
 Newcastle (New South Wales, Australia)
 Gregory (Western Australia, Australia)
 Midget sub attack
 Sydney (New South Wales, Australia)
 Diego Suarez (Madagascar)

Asia Territorial evolution of the British Empire

In Asia Territorial evolution of the French Empire

 French Indochina
French Indochinese Union (1887–1954)
Laos (protectorate) (1893–1953)
 Cambodia (protectorate) (1863–1953)
Vietnam
Cochinchina (Southern Vietnam) (1858–1949)
 Annam (protectorate) (Central Vietnam) (1883–1949)
 Tonkin (protectorate) (Northern Vietnam) (1884–1949)
 State of Vietnam (1949–1954)
 Spratly Islands (1933–1939)
 Paracel Islands (1933–1939) 
some territories on the eastern of Thailand (Independent State, but After Franco-Siamese War in 1893. Thailand has lost 3 territories in total in the past 15 years, for example)
 Chanthaburi Province (1893–1904)
 Trat Province (1904–1907)
 Dan Sai District (in the area of the Loei Province:1903–1907)
 India and Sri Lanka
 French India
 French Establishments of India, composed of Pondichéry (1765–1954); Karikal (1725–1954); Mahé (1721–1954) Yanaon (1723–1954); Chandernagor (1673–1952) 
 Taiwan 
 The city/port of Keelung (1884–1885)
 Pescadores Islands (1885)
 Basilan (1845)
 China
 The territory of Kouang-Tchéou-Wan, a dependency of French Indochina) (1898–1945)
 The foreign concessions : French Concession of Shanghai (1849–1946), Tianjin (1860–1946) and Hankou (1898–1946)
 The Spheres of French influence officially recognised by China in the provinces of Yunnan, Guangxi, Hainan, Guangdong
 Shamian Island (1859–1949) (a fifth of the island)
 Palestine
 Syria or French Syria (1920–1946) (French Mandate of Syria)
 Alawite State (1920–1936)
 State of Aleppo (1920–1924)
 State of Jabal Druze (1921–1936)
 State of Damascus (1920–1924)
 Sanjak of Alexandretta (now part of Turkey)
 State of Greater Lebanon (now it is Lebanon) (1920–1946)
 Lebanon or French Lebanon (1920–1946) (French Mandate of Lebanon)
 Mount Lebanon (An international protocol fixes the autonomy of the mount Lebanon under the protection of France)
 Yemen
 Cheikh Saïd (Some French atlases and history books claimed the territory was French, but France never occupied it and never claimed jurisdiction or sovereignty over the territory, which therefore was never French, remaining under Turkish, then Yemeni control.

See also 

United Nations list of non-self-governing territories
List of dependent territories
List of predecessors of sovereign states in Asia
Colonialism
Persian Gulf Residency
Imperialism in Asia
Taiwan under Japanese rule
Decolonisation
Decolonisation of Africa
Wars of national liberation

Notes

References

Further reading 
Panikkar, K. M. (1953) Asia and Western Dominance, 1498–1945, London: G. Allen and Unwin.

Decolonization
History of Asia
European colonisation in Asia
Aftermath of World War II
Decolonization by region